Monte Aymond may refer to:

Monte Aymond (mountain)
Monte Aymond, Argentina
Monte Aymond, Chile